Norwegian singer Lene Marlin has released four studio albums, one compilation album, 16 singles (including two as a featured artist) and one video album.

Albums

Studio albums

Compilation albums

Singles

As lead artist

As featured artist

Video albums

References

External links
 
 
 

Discographies of Norwegian artists
Pop music discographies